Heart & Symphony is Japanese pop singer Hitomi Shimatani's fifth studio album. There is both a CD and CD+DVD format. The CD+DVD version is limited, and the first pressing of the CD only version comes with a bonus track.

The album has a number of techno/dance tracks, as well as a song with an element of rock in it, but it is also notable for, as the title alludes, mixing a bit of pop and balladry with classical and symphonic music - such as the tracks Sarasoujou and Salvia. The title, Heart&Symphony, incorporates Hitomi's initials.

The album's lyrical content seems to tell a story, starting from the beginnings of love to heartbreak and, finally, acceptance, strength, and a new love.

Track listing
 Sky High
 Falco -ファルコ- (Faruko)
 真昼の月 (Mahiru no tsuki, lit. Midday Moon)
 沙羅双樹 (Sara Souju, lit Sal Tree)
 Salvia
 Garnet Moon/Inori
 Mona Lisa
 Kokoro (lit. Heart)
 Mermaid
 太陽神 (Taiyou Shin, lit. Sun God)
 Voice
 フレーム (Frame)
 Viola (crossover version) (Bonus Track - CD Only Version)

DVD track listing
 Document Movie of H.S: Making of Heart & Symphony & More

Hitomi Shimatani albums
2005 albums